Sadhbh (also spelled Sadb, Saibh, Sadbh, Sadhb, Saoibh, Saoibhe , Sive) is an Irish feminine personal name. Derived from Proto-Celtic  '(the) sweet and lovely (lady)', the name is cognate with the initial elements in the attested Gallic names Suadu-gena and Suadu-rix and with Sanskrit svādú-, Ancient Greek hedýs, Latin  (compare Suada), Tocharian B swāre and Modern English sweet.

The town Cahersiveen in County Kerry roughly translates to 'The Fortress of Little Sadhbh'.

The Whiteboys, a secret agrarian organisation in 18th century Ireland, referred to themselves as "Queen Sive Oultagh's children" ("Sive" or "Sieve Oultagh" being anglicised from the Irish Sadhbh Amhaltach, or Ghostly Sally).

Notable people
Sadhbh Nic Donnchadh, daughter of Donnchadh, King of Ossory and wife of Ard-Rí Donnachadh mac Flann Sionna; patroness of Saighir
Sadhbh O'Sullivan, member of the band The Isohels
"Sadhbh Trinseach", name adopted by Irish nationalist artist Cesca Chenevix Trench

In fiction
In Irish mythology, Sadhbh (or Saba) was the mother of Oisín by Fionn mac Cumhail
Sadb ingen Chuinn was a daughter of Conn of the Hundred Battles, a High King of Ireland
Sive, a 1959 play by John B. Keane and also the name of its lead character
Traditional Irish sean-nós song, Sadhbh Ní Bhruinnealigh

References

See also
Sabin (disambiguation)

Irish feminine given names